Marnix Verhegghe (Palmanova, 25 September 1961) is a Belgian hammer thrower.

Biography
He is the national record holder of the hammer throw.

Achievements

National championships
2 wins in hammer throw (1984, 1988)

References

External links
 IAAF profile for Marnix Verhegghe

1961 births
Living people
Belgian male hammer throwers
20th-century Belgian people